Sergei Prokofiev's Piano Sonata No. 7 in B major, Op. 83 (1942) (occasionally called the "Stalingrad") is a sonata composed for solo piano, the second (and most famous) of the three "War Sonatas". The sonata was first performed on 18 January 1943 in Moscow by Sviatoslav Richter. Performances of this sonata can last anywhere from 17 to about 20 minutes.

Historical background

On 20 June 1939 Prokofiev's close friend and professional associate, the director Vsevolod Meyerhold, was arrested by the NKVD just before he was due to rehearse Prokofiev's new opera Semyon Kotko; he was shot on 2 February 1940. Although his death was not publicly acknowledged, let alone widely known about until after Stalin's reign, the brutal murder of Meyerhold's wife, Zinaida Raikh, less than a month after his arrest was a notorious event. Only months afterwards, Prokofiev was 'invited' to compose Zdravitsa (literally translated 'Cheers!', but more often given the English title Hail to Stalin) (Op. 85) to celebrate Joseph Stalin's 60th birthday.

Later that year, Prokofiev started composing his Piano Sonatas Nos 6, 7, and 8, Opp. 82–84, widely known today as the "War Sonatas." These sonatas contain some of Prokofiev's most dissonant music for the piano. Biographer Daniel Jaffé has argued that Prokofiev, "having forced himself to compose a cheerful evocation of the nirvana Stalin wanted everyone to believe he had created" (i.e. in Zdravitsa) then subsequently, in these three sonatas, "expressed his true feelings". It was therefore ironic (most especially given the musical allusion identified by Jaffé in the central movement: see below) that Sonata No. 7 received a Stalin Prize (Second Class).

Movements
The sonata has three movements.

I. Allegro inquieto

The Allegro inquieto pays homage to and mocks the classical sonata form.  As the tempo suggests, the tempo and rhythms are very nervous and suspenseful.  The opening theme is mocking and harsh, and features many loud cluster-like chords.  The second theme is a slow, thoughtful theme that seems to wander both through various keys and harmonies, and motifs.  This long section begins to slowly pick up and results in the tumultuous, extremely chromatic and violent development.  After reprising a portion of the slow section, a final quick, mocking fragment of the main theme is presented which ends in the only full statement of the key of the piece with a quiet, quick roll of the B major chord in the lowest possible registers of the piano.

The music is labeled as being in the key of B-flat major, and contains musical elements pointing to B-flat as a home note in the vein of the classical sonata form: a first theme centered on B-flat, a second theme whose iteration in the exposition is centered on A-flat and whose iteration in the recapitulation is centered on B-flat, and an ending that returns the tonal center to B-flat and concludes the piece with a B-flat major chord.  However, this movement distinctively lacks the key signature of B-flat major.

II. Andante caloroso

The slow section is initially very beautiful, but seeping with sentimental emotion. Jaffé has pointed out that the opening theme is based on Robert Schumann's Lied, 'Wehmut' ('Sadness', which appears in Schumann's Liederkreis, Op. 39): the words to this translate "I can sometimes sing as if I were glad, yet secretly tears well and so free my heart. Nightingales... sing their song of longing from their dungeon's depth... everyone delights, yet no one feels the pain, the deep sorrow in the song." This opening theme quickly decays into an extremely chromatic section which sifts through various tonal centers, none of which seem familiar to the E that began the piece.  After a clangorous, bell-like climax, the music slows and melts into the lush opening theme once more.

III. Precipitato
The Precipitato finale, once described as "an explosive burst of rock 'n' roll with a chromatic edge", is a toccata in relentless septuple time which boldly affirms the key of the sonata through a more diatonic harmonic language than found in the first movement.  This is obvious from the very beginning, with simple B major triads repeated over and over again.  Despite a wide range of performance tempos chosen by different pianists, the effect is nevertheless imposing and exciting. The toccata culminates into a furious recapitulation of the main theme, taxing all ten fingers to the utmost, until the piece finally ends triumphantly in a thundering cascade of octaves.  The precipitato of this sonata is regarded as technically highly demanding.

Recordings
The Sonata has been recorded (in chronological order) by: 
Vladimir Horowitz (RCA 1945 | The work's first recording)
Friedrich Gulda (Decca 1947)
Sviatoslav Richter (CCCP 1958)
Vladimir Ashkenazy (Decca 1965)
Grigory Sokolov (Melodiya 1969)
Glenn Gould (Columbia 1969)
Maurizio Pollini (Deutsche Grammophon 1971)
Martha Argerich (EMI 1979 | Live)
Alexander Toradze (Angel 1986)
Andrei Gavrilov (Deutsche Grammophon 1991)
Barry Douglas (RCA Victor 1991)
Lang Lang (Gran Turismo 5 2010)
Peter Donohoe (Somm 2014)
Steven Osborne (Hyperion 2020)

References

Berman, Boris Prokofiev's Piano Sonatas (Yale University Press, 2008)
Jaffé, Daniel Sergey Prokofiev (London: Phaidon, 1998)

External links
 Prokofiev's Sonata No. 7 on Classical Connect.

Video – Prokofiev Piano Sonata No 7 – Complete (19:03).
Prokofiev Piano Sonata No 7 in B major, Op. 83 (1942).
Video – Prokofiev Piano Sonata No 7 mvt 1 (08:57).
Video – Prokofiev Piano Sonata No 7 mvt 2 (07:11).
Video – Prokofiev Piano Sonata No 7 mvt 3 (03:46).

Compositions by Sergei Prokofiev
Piano sonatas by Sergei Prokofiev
20th-century classical music
1942 compositions
Compositions in B-flat major
Piano compositions in the 20th century